Malayagiri, is a mountain peak in the Malayagiri hills subrange of the Garhjat Range. It is located near Pal Lahara town near Angul in the Angul district of Odisha. 

At , it is not the highest mountain in Orissa; Deomali is taller at 1672 meters, followed by 1597 m high Turiakonda.

Citations

References
 

Mountains of Odisha